This is a list of people who are notable as harpists.

A

 Mike Absalom
 Ruth Acuff
 Kirsten Agresta
 Pauline Åhman
 Silke Aichhorn
 Nancy Allen (harpist)
 Elias Parish Alvars
 Glafira Alymova
 Jon Anderson of the band Yes
 Fulgencio Aquino
 Dorothy Ashby
 Athy

B

 Baby Dee
 Winifred Bambrick - (1892–1969) - Canadian classical musician and novelist
 Cormac de Barra - Irish singer, musician, and television presenter; part of the Moya Brennan Band
 William fitz Robert Barry - (fl. 1615) - blind harper in the service of David de Barry, 5th Viscount Buttevant
 Derek Bell
 Elinor Bennett
 Stephanie Bennett
 Hugo Blanco
 Hana Blažíková - (born 1980) - Czech soprano, harpist, and interpreter of Baroque, Medieval, and Renaissance music
 Nicolas-Charles Bochsa - (1789–1856) - French-Australian musician and composer appointed to the Imperial Orchestra
 Jana Boušková (born 1970)
 Robin Huw Bowen - Exponent of the Welsh Triple Harp and authentic Welsh harp repertoire 
 Cristina Braga
 Moya Brennan - (born 1952) - Irish folk singer, songwriter, harpist, and philanthropist; member of Clannad
 Corina Brouder
 Giolla Críost Brúilingeach
 Olivia Buckley
 Charles Bunworth - (1704 – 1772) - Church of Ireland rector of Buttevant, County Cork, Ireland
 Patrick Byrne - (c. 1794 – 1863) - last noted Gaelic harpist in Ireland and first Irish musician to be photographed

C
 Maria Rosa Calvo-Manzano
 Félix Pérez Cardozo
 Dee Carstensen
 Edmar Castañeda
 Emmanuel Ceysson
 Cecilia Chailly
 Alice Chalifoux
 Máire Ní Chathasaigh - (born 1956) - five-time winner of the All-Ireland music competition
 Pearl Chertok
 Elaine Christy
Zhay Clark (1895-1980), later known as Zhay Moor
 Marie-Elizabeth Cléry - (1761–1795) - French composer and harpist in the court of Marie-Antoinette
 Alice Coltrane
 Thomas Connellan - (c. 1640 – 1698) - Irish harper and composer whose "Molly St. George" is one of the earliest Irish harp songs with extant lyrics; brother of William Connellan
 William Connellan - 17th century Irish harper and composer; brother of Thomas Connellan
 Cécile Corbel - (born 1980) - Breton recording artist and composer

D
 Abramino dall'Arpa - (1577–1593) - one of the few Jewish musicians in Mantua, Italy in the late 16th century
 Abramo dall'Arpa - (????–1566) - Italian harpist in the court of Mantua, Italy, and later tutor of the children of Ferdinand I, Holy Roman Emperor
 Rhodri Davies
 Vera Dulova
 Sophia Dussek

E

 Osian Ellis
 Víctor Espínola

F

 Órla Fallon - (born 1974) - Irish soloist, songwriter, and former member of the group Celtic Woman and the chamber choir Anúna
 Vincent Fanelli - (1881–1966) - Italian-American classical musician and educator, principal harpist of the Philadelphia Orchestra
 Charles Fanning - (1736 – c. 1792) - winner of Ireland's Granard Harp Festival in 1781, 1782, and 1783
 Piaras Feiritéar - (c. 1600 – 1653) - poet and Catholic Irish leader
 Ignacio Figueredo - (1899–1995) - Venezuelan folk musician
 Catrin Finch -  (born 1980) - Welsh harpist, arranger, and composer; Official Harpist to the Prince of Wales from 2000 to 2004
 Cheryl Ann Fulton - American performer and teacher

G
 Mara Galassi
 Marilinda Garcia
 Stéphanie Félicité, comtesse de Genlis - (1746–1830) - French writer, harpist, and educator known for her children's works
 Adele Girard
 Betty Glamann
 Félix Godefroid
 Marie Goossens
 Sidonie Goossens
 Tristan Le Govic
 Phamie Gow
 Marcel Grandjany

H

 Keiji Haino 
 Rachel Hair - Scottish folk harpist
 Corky Hale
Janet Harbison - Irish harper
 Ruth Berman Harris
 Alphonse Hasselmans
 Petra van der Heide
 Deborah Henson-Conant
 Corrina Hewat - (born 1970) - winner of Scotland's Music Tutor of the Year award at the 2013 Na Trads
 Hugh Higgins - (1737–1791) - blind Irish harper
 Erin Hill
 Franziska Huhn - (born 1977) - German-American performer and composer; winner of the Jugend musiziert prize
 Robert ap Huw

I
 Varvara Ivanova (born 1987)

J
 Angharad James - (1677–1749) - early Welsh female poet and harpist
 James James
 Siân James - (born 1961) - Welsh traditional folk singer and harpist
 Pierre Jamet
 Maria Johansdotter
 Claire Jones
 Edward Jones

K

 Skaila Kanga
 Camille and Kennerly Kitt
 Yolanda Kondonassis
 Maria Korchinska
 Iris Kroes
 Johann Baptist Krumpholtz
 Valeria Kurbatova

L
 Théodore Labarre - (1805–1870) - French harpist, composer, and professor
 Lily Laskine - (1893–1988) - French performer and professor who received the Legion of Honour in 1958
 Mary Lattimore 
 Lucile Lawrence
Lucinda Belle
 Anne LeBaron
 Caroline Leonardelli - French-Canadian performer and recording artist; principal harpist with the Ottawa Symphony
 Lloyd Lindroth
 Judy Loman
 Lisa Lynne
 Cornelius Lyons - (1670–1740) - Irish harper of the Earl of Antrim

M

 Marie Antoinette - last queen of France
 Cormac MacDermott - (?–1618) - harper with the English Royal Musick
 Amhlaeibh Mac Innaighneorach - (?–1168) - Chief Harper of Ireland, one of the earliest recorded Irish professional musicians
 Manuel Machado
 Mary Macmaster - (born 1955) - Scottish harpist who performs with The Poozies and in the duo Sileas
 Eileen Malone
 José Marín
 Harpo Marx - (1888–1964)
 Gulnara Mashurova
 Susann McDonald
 Loreena McKennitt  - (born 1957) - Canadian composer and multi-instrumentalist whose albums have sold more than 14 million copies
 Geraldine McMahon
 Katie McMahon
 Lavinia Meijer
 Luisa Menárguez
 Anna Maria Mendieta
 Orazio Michi
 Susanna Mildonian
 Valérie Milot - Canadian soloist and chamber musician; the first harpist to win the Prix d’Europe
 Áine Minogue
 Rose Mooney
 David Murphy

N

 François Joseph Naderman
 Jean Henri Naderman
 Fatma Ceren Necipoğlu
 Lily Neill
 Joanna Newsom

O
 Máel Sechnaill Ruadh Ó Braonáin
 Donell Dubh Ó Cathail
 Eachmarcach Ó Catháin
 Ruaidri Dáll Ó Catháin
 Maol Ruanaidh Cam Ó Cearbhaill
 Eoghain Ó Cianáin
 Thady Ó Cianáin
 Fláithrí Ó Corcrán
 Cearbhall Óg Ó Dálaigh - (fl. 1630) - Irish poet and harpist
 Diarmuid Ó Dubhagáin
 Donnchadh Ó Hámsaigh
 Mary O'Hara
 Dominic Ó Mongain
 Máel Ísa Ó Raghallaigh
 Turlough O'Carolan
 Arthur O'Neill
 Hugh O'Neill
 Natalia O'Shea
 Rüdiger Oppermann - (born 1954) - German experimental musician; plays a custom-made clàrsach with 38 gold-plated bronze strings and a special mechanism that allows him to bend notes in a manner akin to blues musicians
 Coline-Marie Orliac - (born 1989) - two-time winner of the USA International Harp Competition
 Alfredo Rolando Ortiz
 David Owen
 Siobhan Owen - (born 1993) - Welsh-Australian soprano; winner of several music awards including two Irish Music Awards

P

 Annemiek Padt-Jansen
 Şirin Pancaroğlu
 Zeena Parkins
 John Parry - (1710–1782) - blind Welsh harpist, credited with writing Deck the Halls, inspiration for Thomas Gray's 1757 poem, The Bard (poem)
 John Parry - (1776–1851) - better known as Bardd Alaw
 Laura Peperara
 Roberto Perera
 Edna Phillips
 Jemima Phillips
 Nicholas Dáll Pierce
 Ann Hobson Pilot - (born 1943) - former principal harpist of the Boston Symphony Orchestra and the Boston Pops

R

 Monica Ramos
 Elizabeth Randles
 Anna-Maria Ravnopolska-Dean - (born 1960) - Bulgarian concert harpist and academic; a founder of the American University in Bulgaria
 Casper Reardon
 Susan Reed
 Henriette Renié
 Lucas Ruiz de Ribayaz
 Nansi Richards - (1888–1979) - Welsh harpist appointed official harpist to Charles, Prince of Wales
 Kim Robertson
 Marisa Robles
 Claire Roche
 Henrik Rohmann - (1910–1978) - Hungarian performer and teacher
 Clotilde Rosa
 Mindy Rosenfeld
 Diana Rowan
 Jaroslav Řídký - (1897–1956) - Czech composed, conductor, harpist, and teacher

S
 Floraleda Sacchi - (born 1978) - recording artist, composer, and musicologist from Italy
 Arnold Safroni-Middleton
 Victor Salvi
 Carlos Salzedo
 Arianna Savall
 Anne van Schothorst
 Patsy Seddon - Scottish harpist known for work with The Poozies, Sileas, and Clan Alba
 Therese Schroeder-Sheker
 Marianne Smit
 David Snell (musician)
 Monika Stadler
 Serafina Steer
 Savourna Stevenson
 Alan Stivell - (born 1944) - Celtic recording artist
 Jessica Suchy-Pilalis
 Tomoko Sugawara
 Andrei Sychra

T
 Mia Theodoratus
 John Thomas
 Thomas Thomas
 Julia Thornton
 Miriam Timothy
 Juan Vicente Torrealba
 Marcel Tournier
 Tuotilo
 JoAnn Turovsky

V
 Verónica Valerio
 Victor Espinola
 Andreas Vollenweider

W
 Sylvia Woods (harpist)
 Aristid von Würtzler - (1925–1997) - Hungarian-American leader of the New York Harp Ensemble

Y
 Gráinne Yeats
 Brandee Younger

Z
 Nicanor Zabaleta
 Pacifica Zelaya - (1882-1907) - Costa Rican harpist who studied at the Royal Conservatory of Brussels
 Liao Zilan
 Vincenzo Zitello

References

Harpists
Harpists